The 1904 Massachusetts gubernatorial election was held on November 8, 1904. Incumbent Republican Governor John L. Bates ran for a third term, but was defeated by Democratic nominee William L. Douglas.

General election

Results

See also
 1904 Massachusetts legislature

References

Bibliography

Governor
1904
Massachusetts
November 1904 events